Dean Marney (born 1952) is the author of several children's books along a common theme, including:
The Christmas Tree That Ate My Mother
The Computer That Ate My Brother
The Easter Bunny That Ate My Sister
The Jack-O'-Lantern That Ate My Brother
The Turkey That Ate My Father and
The Valentine That Ate My Teacher

He is also the writer of Pet-rified!, How to Drive Your Family Crazy... On Halloween and How to Drive Your Family Crazy... On Valentine's Day.

References
"Dean Marney". Contemporary Authors Online, Gale, 2006.

Living people
1952 births
American children's writers